Mycopteris is a genus of ferns in the family Polypodiaceae, subfamily Grammitidoideae, according to the Pteridophyte Phylogeny Group classification of 2016 (PPG I). It is known from the American tropics.

Description
Most members of the genus are epiphytes, although some grow on soil or on rocks.

Taxonomy
The genus was first described by Michael Sundue in 2014 to receive some of the species of the genus Terpsichore. When that genus was described by Alan R. Smith in 1993, he divided it into five informal groups. Subsequent morphological and molecular studies showed that Terpsichore was polyphyletic, but its groups were largely monophyletic and could furnish the basis of new genera. These genera were described over the next several years; Sundue's new genus Mycopteris, encompassing the T. taxifolia group, was the last group to be removed from Terpsichore sensu lato.

The name "Mycopteris" is derived from the Greek roots myco-, "fungus", and -pteris, "fern", referring to the near-universal association of these ferns with the ascomycete fungus Acrospermum. Sundue initially placed seventeen species in the genus, one of which was newly described and another elevated from a variety. He suggested that another five to ten species might be described after the completion of a monograph on the genus. In 2017, he described a new species, Mycopteris martiniana, from Mexico.

Species
, the Checklist of Ferns and Lycophytes of the World accepted the following species:
Mycopteris alsopteris (C.V.Morton) Sundue
Mycopteris amphidasyon (Mett.) Sundue
Mycopteris attenuatissima (Copel.) Sundue
Mycopteris costaricensis (Rosenst.) Sundue
Mycopteris cretata (Maxon) Sundue
Mycopteris grata (Fée) Sundue
Mycopteris leucolepis (Gilbert) Sundue
Mycopteris leucosticta (J.Sm.) Sundue
Mycopteris longicaulis (Sundue & M.Kessler) Sundue
Mycopteris longipilosa Sundue
Mycopteris martiniana Sundue
Mycopteris pirrensis (A.R.Sm.) Sundue
Mycopteris praeceps (Sundue & M.Kessler) Sundue
Mycopteris semihirsuta (Klotzsch) Sundue
Mycopteris steyermarkii (Labiak) Sundue
Mycopteris subtilis (Kunze ex Klotzsch) Sundue
Mycopteris taxifolia (L.) Sundue
Mycopteris zeledoniana (Lellinger) Sundue

Distribution
Members of the genus are found from Mexico east into the East Indies and south to Bolivia.

References

Polypodiaceae
Fern genera